The 1905–06 Delaware Fightin' Blue Hens men's basketball team represented the University of Delaware during the 1905–06 collegiate men's basketball season. In the first season in school history, Delaware compiled a 3–4–1 record. Their coach was Samuel Saunder.

Schedule

References

Delaware Fightin' Blue Hens men's basketball seasons
Delaware
1905 in sports in Delaware
1906 in sports in Delaware